McDonald & Co. is U.S. investment firm.

McDonald & Co may also refer to:
McDonald & Co, an imprint of Little, Brown Book Group
McDonald & Co, a successor company of  Alexander McDonald (sculptor)

See also
Macdonald (disambiguation)